Nyasvizh District is a district (raion) of Minsk Region, Belarus.

Notable residents 

 Alexander Nadson (1926, Haradzeja – 2015), the Apostolic Visitor for Belarusian Greek-Catholic faithful abroad, scholar, translator and a notable Belarusian émigré social and religious leader
 Uładzimir Žyłka (1900, Makašy village – 1933), Belarusian poet and Gulag prisoner

References

 
Districts of Minsk Region